Robert Gilbert was a medieval Bishop of London.

Gilbert was appointed Dean of the Chapel Royal around 1421.

Gilbert was elected bishop 23 February 1436, provided on 21 May 1436, and consecrated on 28 October 1436. He died about 27 July 1448.

Citations

References

 

Year of birth unknown
1448 deaths
Bishops of London
Deans of York
Deans of the Chapel Royal
Archdeacons of Durham